Theodore F. Bagge (November 30, 1820, Gentofte, Kobenhavn, Denmark – March 26, 1886, Oakland, California) was a Democratic member of the California State Assembly for the 14th District (the East Bay) from 1875 to 1877.

References

Members of the California State Legislature
San Francisco Bay Area politicians
1820 births
1886 deaths
19th-century American politicians